Thorton may refer to:

People
 Tanya Thorton Shewell, former member of the Maryland House of Delegates

Fictional characters
 Professor Thorton (Marvel Comics), a fictional comic book character
 Michael Thorton, a fictional spy from the videogame Alpha Protocol, see List of fictional secret agents
 Thorton, the Factory Head of Sinnoh in the Pokémon games

Other uses
 A revision of AMD's Athlon XP processor.

See also

 
 
 Thornton (disambiguation)